The 2011 Nippon Professional Baseball season is the 62nd season since the NPB was reorganized in 1950. The season was delayed by the Tohoku earthquake. The Tohoku Rakuten Golden Eagles, based in northern Japan, and coached by Senichi Hoshino, were particularly affected by the quake, as the Miyagi Baseball Stadium was badly damaged. 

Because of energy concerns following the earthquake, NPB also imposed restrictions on games during the regular season.  A three-hour-thirty-minute rule was imposed.  If a game went past the 3:30 mark, regardless of inning, the inning in question would be the last inning.  A game would be called should any blackout occur during the game.  The 3:30 clock starts at the first pitch of the game and continues in case of any delay.

At the season's end, the Yokohama BayStars was renamed as Yokohama DeNA BayStars as the owner changes.

Regular season standings

Climax Series 

Note: All of the games that are played in the first two rounds of the Climax Series are held at the higher seed's home stadium. The team with the higher regular-season standing also advances if the round ends in a tie.

First stage 
The regular season league champions, the Fukuoka SoftBank Hawks (PL) and the Chunichi Dragons (CL), received byes to the championship round.

Central League

Pacific League

Final stage 
The regular season league champions, the Fukuoka SoftBank Hawks (PL) and the Chunichi Dragons (CL), received a one-game advantage.

Central League

Pacific League

Japan Series

League leaders

Central League

Pacific League

See also 
 2011 Korea Professional Baseball season
 2011 Major League Baseball season

References